Club Deportivo Laudio de Fútbol San Rokezar is a Spanish football team based in Laudio/Llodio, in the autonomous community of Basque Country. Founded in 2002 it plays in Segunda División B – Group 2, holding home matches at Estadio Ellakuri, which has a capacity of 3.500 spectators.

History
Sociedad Deportiva Llodio - (1927–40)
Club Deportivo Villosa - (1940–72)
Sociedad Deportiva Llodio - (1972–2002)
Club Deportivo Laudio - (2002–)

Founded in 2002 as the successor of several clubs dating back to 1927, Laudio reached the fourth tier of Spanish football (Tercera División) a year later. In 2012 the club won its group, but lost 3–0 on aggregate in the playoff final to San Fernando CD. In winning that group, the club qualified for the first time to the Copa del Rey, where they lost in the first round at home by a single goal to neighbours SD Eibar.

Again the group winners, Laudio made the playoffs in 2013 and defeated Mar Menor FC in the final via a goal from Germán Beltrán. In the subsequent cup run, they dispatched Real Unión and Écija Balompié before a penalty shootout elimination in the third round at home to CD Olímpic de Xàtiva.

Laudio's only season in Segunda División B in 2013–14 ended with relegation in 17th place. However, the club was given a further demotion back to the regional leagues due to wage backlogs of €200,000 to its players.

Season to season

1 season in Segunda División B
10 seasons in Tercera División

References

External links
Official website 
Futbolme team profile 

Football clubs in the Basque Country (autonomous community)
Association football clubs established in 2002
2002 establishments in Spain